Hermine "Herma" Bauma (January 23, 1915, in Vienna – February 9, 2003, in Vienna) was an Austrian athlete who competed mainly in the javelin. She also was famous for playing handball.

Bauma competed for Austria at the 1948 Summer Olympics held in London, United Kingdom in the javelin where she won the gold medal.

References

1915 births
2003 deaths
Austrian female javelin throwers
Olympic gold medalists for Austria
Athletes (track and field) at the 1936 Summer Olympics
Athletes (track and field) at the 1948 Summer Olympics
Athletes (track and field) at the 1952 Summer Olympics
Athletes from Vienna
Olympic athletes of Austria
European Athletics Championships medalists
Medalists at the 1948 Summer Olympics
Olympic gold medalists in athletics (track and field)
Women's World Games medalists
20th-century Austrian women